Ashley Clinton is a rural community in the Central Hawke's Bay District and Hawke's Bay Region of New Zealand's North Island. 

Ashley Clinton is located between Norsewood and Ongaonga, some 18 kilometres west of Waipukurau. It is an almost triangular block bounded to the west by the Ruahine Forest Park, the Tukituki River to the north, and the Makaretu River to the south. It is centred on the intersection of State Highway 50 and Ashcott Road. The area consists of sheep, dairy and mixed use farms.

Origin and history

Settler period
The Ashley Clinton area was acquired by the Government from the local Maori in the 1850's and consists of part of the Ruahine, Ruataniwha and Makaretu Blocks.

Ashley Clinton's name was most likely derived from Ashley Clinton Estate, Hampshire, England. A primary school, Ashley Clinton School, was established in the main village in 1876 but has since closed.. Its school hall was the centre for community functions, meetings, and gathering.

In 1883 a Post Office was opened in Ashley Clinton. The Government named it Makeritu, which caused confusion with mail being occasionally misdirected. Makaretu, another small settlement nearby was seeking its own Post Office at this time but was declined as it was thought that they already had one due to the name similarity. The issue was raised with the Government, with both Makaretu and Ashley Clinton asking that the Post Office's name be changed to Ashley Clinton. The Post Office was renamed in January 1885. There was a store run by a Mr Loye at Ashley Clinton in 1883.

Fires, bush fires, and a fired teacher
In 1886 the school teacher, Charles Morton's, house was burnt down. The house also contained the community library which was also destroyed. The house and library were replaced in 1887. That same year horse racing (hurdles) was held at Ashley Clinton. The great Norsewood fire of 1888 destroyed two houses. Another bush fire passed by Asley Clinton in 1895 but caused no damage to infrastructure there. Another severe fire passed through the area in February 1896 destroying a number of settlers' homes along with the school house and a number of bridges in the surrounding district. These continued to plague the area with bush fires being reported as late as 1938.

Later in 1896 the school headmaster was initially involved in an altercation with one of the school committee members, and was given notice by the Education Board. This brought about a court case appealing the decision — the first such appeal under the then new Public-School Teachers Incorporation and Court of Appeal Act 1895.

Development
A telephone service was installed in 1891. In 1893 the W Morton and Co sawmill was upgraded and offered more employment in the area.Bush News, Hawke's Bay Herald, 28 September 1893, p. 4. Retrieved 18 March 2023. The mill, renamed as James Smith and Co. sawmill in 1895, was closed on 31 March 1896. 

Some time prior to 1893 a hall, Durham Hall, was constructed in Ashley-Clinton and used for various gatherings. Through this time a coach service ran from Ashley Clinton to Takapau. By 1895 a butcher and a blacksmith had taken up residence in the immediate area, and a rugby club was formed. Rabbits had become a significant pest in the area with the Ashley Clinton Rabbit Association being formed in 1896 with the aim of eradicating them.

Since 1900
By the early 1900s Ashley Clinton had a minature rifle club and a lawn tennis club. This was later followed by a Ladies Institute.

In 1912 the former store and post office were replaced.

In 1921 a glass war memorial was installed at Ashley Clinton Memorial dedicated to the five local men killed in World War I.

In 1971 drilling was carried out by Beaver Exploration (New Zealand) Limited at Ashley Clinton, Takapau, and Ongaonga. Small pockets of natural gas were found.

In 2013, residents of Black Road launched a campaign to have the road sealed.

Literature
 Ashley Clinton School - 86th Anniversary, 1876-1962, Author: By Ashley Clinton. School. Jubilee Committee · 1962

Education
In 1938 the Education Board proposed merging the Makaretu and Ashley Clinton schools at Sherwood. The site was deemed best suited as it was almost equidistant from both schools and could be serviced by a school bus from both areas. Two petitions were submitted with a number of parents in Ashley Clinton against the proposal and a number in Makaretu in favour.

Sherwood School is a Year 1–8 co-educational state primary school.

References

Central Hawke's Bay District
Populated places in the Hawke's Bay Region